The 2019–20 Georgia State Panthers men's basketball team represented Georgia State University during the 2019–20 NCAA Division I men's basketball season. The team's head coach was Rob Lanier, who was coaching his first season at Georgia State. The Panthers played their home games at the GSU Sports Arena in Atlanta, Georgia as a member of the Sun Belt Conference. They finished the season 19–13, 12–8 in Sun Belt play to finish in a tie for fourth place. They were the No. 4 seed in the Sun Belt tournament, where they lost to Georgia Southern.

Previous season 
The Panthers finished the season 24–10, 13–5 in the Sun Belt, claiming the title of SBC regular season champions. The Panthers also went on to defeat Texas State and UT Arlington to become back-to-back champions of the Sun Belt tournament. As a result, they received the Sun Belt's automatic bid to the NCAA tournament. As the No. 14 seed in the Midwest region, they lost to Houston in the first round.
After losing in the NCAA tournament, it was reported that head coach Ron Hunter had been offered the head coaching position at Tulane, to which he responded that he was going to take 48 hours to think about the future. On March 24, Tulane officially announced Hunter as head coach. It was later reported Hunter opted to leave Georgia State due to a disagreement between the university and Hunter over contract details regarding performance bonuses, tying them to his team's GPA, which was purported by the university to be declining year after year. On 5 April 2019, Georgia State announced the selection of Rob Lanier, associate head coach for the Tennessee Vols, to head the program at GSU.

Offseason

Departures

Incoming transfers

2019 recruiting class

Roster

Regular season
 The Panthers won the regional championship of the 2K Empire Classic.
 Kane Williams and Justin Roberts were named to the All-Tournament Team of the Empire Classic. Williams was also named the regional MVP.

Schedule and results

|-
!colspan=9 style=| Exhibition

|-
!colspan=9 style=| Regular season

|-
!colspan=9 style=| Sun Belt tournament

References

Georgia State Panthers men's basketball seasons
Georgia State